Alan Ford (born July 2, 1943) is a former Canadian football player and executive. Currently he is a scout for the Montreal Alouettes. He played as defensive back and punter from 1965–1976 for the Saskatchewan Roughriders of the Canadian Football League, and acted as Roughriders general manager from 1989–1999.

He helped the Roughriders win the 1966 Grey Cup, and place second in 1967, in which he made the longest punt in Grey Cup history.

He has been an executive for the Roughriders and the Hamilton Tiger-Cats, winning the 1989 Grey Cup with the Roughriders as general manager (GM). In the late-2000s, Ford acted as a scout for the Montreal Alouettes.

References

1943 births
Living people
Canadian football defensive backs
Canadian football punters
Hamilton Tiger-Cats general managers
Players of Canadian football from Saskatchewan
Saskatchewan Roughriders players
Sportspeople from Saskatoon